The Farman 12We was a French 12-cylinder broad arrow configuration aircraft engine that was designed and built by Farman in the early 1920s. Power output was 370  kilowatts (500 hp).

Design and development
The Farman company developed and produced aero engines from 1915; the 12We was the company's most produced engine. Following the cylinder layout of the Napier Lion this engine featured three banks of four cylinders and employed water cooling.

The 12We was first flown in a Farman F.60 Goliath in October 1922 and later set a distance record powering a Farman F.62 in 1924, the engine ran continuously for 38 hours.

Variants
12Wers with 0.5:1 reduction gear and KP24 supercharger.

Applications

Engines on display
Preserved Farman 12We engines are on static display at the following museums:
Deutsches Museum Flugwerft Schleissheim
Polish Aviation Museum

Specifications)

See also

References

Notes

Bibliography

 Gunston, Bill. World Encyclopaedia of Aero Engines. Cambridge, England. Patrick Stephens Limited, 1989.

External links

Flight - December 1925 article on the Farman Goliath and 12 We engine

1920s aircraft piston engines
W engines